The Clinger–Booth House at 468 South Main Street in Orem, Utah, United States, was built c.1894. It was modified in 1935. It was listed on the National Register of Historic Places in 1998.

See also

 National Register of Historic Places listings in Utah County, Utah

References

Houses completed in 1894
Houses on the National Register of Historic Places in Utah
Houses in Orem, Utah
Victorian architecture in Utah
National Register of Historic Places in Orem, Utah